The Pacific Classic Stakes is a Grade I American Thoroughbred horse race for three-year-olds and older over a distance of one and one quarter miles on the dirt track scheduled annually in August at Del Mar Racetrack in Del Mar, California. The event currently carries a purse of $1,000,000.

History

The event was inaugurated on 10 August 1991 with a purse of US$1 million and immediately became the premier event of the racing season at Del Mar. The first running was won by the 1990 California Horse of the Year three year old Best Pal in a time of 1:59. Best Pal would run two more times finishing third to Bertrando in 1993 and second to Tinners Way in 1994. 

The event was classified as Grade I for the third running in 1993 and has held that class since.

Notable among the runnings of the race was the 1996 renewal that saw champion Cigar attempt to best Citation's mark of 16 straight victories, but fall to a shocking upset by the unheralded 39-1 Dare And Go and jockey Alex Solis. Another exciting running saw Hall of Fame Jockey Julie Krone become the first female rider to win a million-dollar race when she guided Sid and Jenny Craig's undefeated Argentine bred Candy Ride to victory in track record time of 1:59:11. It would be Candy Ride's last race as injury would force him to retire prematurely. 

Del Mar switched its main racing surface from dirt to synthetic Polytrack in 2007 and the Pacific Classic winner that year was long-shot Student Council, who was handled by veteran Richard Migliore.

Starting in 2008, the TVG Pacific Classic became a part of the Breeders' Cup Challenge, where the winner of the race would automatically earn a spot in the Breeders' Cup Classic.
has become one of the top prizes for older horses racing in the United States each year.

In 2015 Beholder became the first filly or mare to win the event. She won by  lengths with a final time of 1:59.77, against an otherwise all-male field of nine other horses, including 2014 Breeders' Cup Classic winner Bayern. She won in the third-fastest winning time in the history of the race, and with the second-largest margin of victory at that time, behind the 2013 win of Game On Dude. In 2018 Accelerate would win by an even greater margin of  lengths.

In 2016 California Chrome became the first Kentucky Derby winner to win the event.

Records

Time record:
 1:59.11 - Candy Ride (2003)

Largest Margin
  lengths - Flightline (2022)

Most wins:
 2 - Tinners Way (1994, 1995)
 2 -  Skimming  (2000, 2001)
 2 -  Richard's Kid  (2009, 2010)

Most wins by an owner:
 4 - Juddmonte Farms (1994, 1995, 2000, 2001)
 4 - Hronis Racing (2018, 2019, 2021, 2022)

Most wins by a jockey:
 4 - Garrett K. Gomez (2000, 2001, 2005, 2008)
 4 - Mike E. Smith (2002, 2009, 2010, 2014)

Most wins by a trainer:
 6 - Robert J. Frankel (1992, 1993, 1994, 1995, 2000, 2001)
 6 - Bob Baffert (1999, 2009, 2010, 2013, 2017, 2020)

Winners

Legend:

 
 

Notes:

§ Ran as part of an entry

ƒ Filly or mare

† Game On Dude's 2013 actual winning time according to "Trakus time" is 1:59.26.

See also
 List of American and Canadian Graded races

References

External links
 2020 Del Mar Media Guide
 Pacific Classic details at Del Mar website
 Ten Things You Should Know About the Pacific Classic at Hello Race Fans

Del Mar Racetrack
Horse races in California
Open middle distance horse races
Grade 1 stakes races in the United States
Breeders' Cup Challenge series
Recurring events established in 1991
1991 establishments in California